Mount Eerie pts. 6 & 7 is an EP released by Mount Eerie. This release acts as an extension to 2003's Mount Eerie, the fourth studio album by Phil Elverum's previous band The Microphones. It was released on a 10" picture disc packaged in a 132-page hardcover artbook of photography taken by Elverum.

Music 
In an interview with The Believer Elverum explained that the songs on Mount Eerie pts. 6 & 7 represent "the relationship between...the large mystery and the everyday" alongside being about "obliviousness v. clarity" and the "idea of “Mount Eerie” as a looming, invisible presence."

Reception

Upon release, the EP received a generally positive reception. Matthew Solarski of Pitchfork wrote that "His apparent new mantra, more mature if less satisfying: Clarity comes and goes, and all we can be certain of is uncertainty."

Track listing

References

External links
 Official site

Mount Eerie albums
2007 EPs